The Institut privé de préparation aux études supérieures (Ipesup) is a non-contracted secular private institution preparing for the Grandes Ecoles competitions. Historically based near Notre-Dame, in Paris, it organizes its preparation programs for the competitive entrance examinations to major business schools, Sciences Po and ENA. It also offers short courses, intensive courses and continuing education cycles.

History
The Institut privé de préparation aux études supérieures (IPESUP group) was created in 1974 by two former students of the École normale supérieure: Gérard Larguier and Patrick Noël.

The IPESUP group was taken over in 2017 by Bertrand Leonard, co-founder of the financial investment company Exane and then president of the HEC foundation and former student of Ipesup.

Notable alumni
 Julien Balkany, a French businessman and an investor based in London
 Jean-Christophe, Prince Napoléon, the disputed head of the former Imperial House of France, and the disputed heir of Napoleon Bonaparte, the First Emperor of the French

Notable teacher
 Emmanuel Macron, a French politician who has served as the president of France, and therefore the co-prince of Andorra, since 2017

Notes

External links
 Site of Ipesup (in French)

Ipesup
Buildings and structures in the 4th arrondissement of Paris
Emmanuel Macron